Felices 140 is a 2015 Spanish comedy-drama film directed by Gracia Querejeta. It was co-written by Querejeta and Antonio Mercero. It was released in Spain on April 10, 2015. On September 8, 2015 it was one of the three entries shortlisted to represent Spain at the 88th Academy Awards in the category for Best Foreign Language Film, but was not selected.

Plot 
Elia gathers a group of friends and family at a fancy holiday home to celebrate her 40th birthday. The guests do not expect what Elia has to tell them: she has won the EuroMillions lottery jackpot. When they receive the news she has won 140 million euros, the guests start planning how they are going to end up with the money.

Cast 
Maribel Verdú as Elia
Antonio de la Torre as Juan
Eduard Fernández as Ramón
Nora Navas as Martina
Marián Álvarez as Cati
Alex O'Dogherty as Polo
Paula Cancio as Claudia
Ginés García Millán as Mario
Marcos Ruiz as Bruno

Awards and nominations

See also 
 List of Spanish films of 2015

References

External links 
 
 Official site (in Spanish)

2015 films
Spanish comedy-drama films
2010s Spanish-language films
2010s Spanish films